Schouten Island (formerly  Schouten's Isle), part of the Schouten Island Group, is an island with an area of approximately  lying close to the eastern coast of Tasmania, Australia, located  south of the Freycinet Peninsula and is a part of Freycinet National Park. The Paredarerme name for the island is Tiggana marraboona.

The locality of Schouten Island is in the local government area of Glamorgan–Spring Bay in the South-east region of Tasmania.

History
Schouten Island lies within the territory of the Oyster Bay tribe of Tasmanian Aborigines and kitchen middens indicates Indigenous tribes inhabited the island prior to European settlement. In 1642, while surveying the south-west coast of Tasmania, Abel Tasman named the island after Joost Schouten, a member of the Council of the Dutch East India Company.

Members of the Baudin expedition landed on Schouten in 1802.  In the early 19th century, sealers were active in the area and are known to have visited the island. Shore-based whaling stations operated on the island in the 1830s and 1840s at five different locations. The discovery of coal on the island in 1809 by a sealer, John Stacey led to between 1842 and 1925, several phases of coal and tin mining, where in 1880 a small number of Chinese men worked the ground for tin. Stacey found that  of land could be suitable for cultivation.  Plans to use convict labour to mine coal on the island in the 1840s were never realised. From 1850 Schouten was used for grazing sheep, with grazing leases only expiring in 1969.

Topography and geology

It is surrounded by cliffs, broken by sheltered bays. A north-south fault line divides the island where the eastern part of the island is composed of granite while the western part is dolerite overlying sedimentary and supergroup rocks.

Flora and fauna
The natural vegetation of the island is dominated by eucalypt forest on the dolerite soils in the west, and by scrubland, heathland and sedgeland communities on the granitic soils of the east.  Areas associated with previous human disturbance, such as clearing, grazing and frequent burning, are dominated by grasses and herbs.

Little penguins and short-tailed shearwaters breed on the island, along with other bird species such as the Tasmanian nativehen.  Australian fur seals haul out on the eastern side.  Reptiles present include the Tasmanian tree skink, she-oak skink, southern grass skink and three-lined skink.

See also

Protected areas of Tasmania
List of islands of Tasmania

References

Further reading
 

Islands of Tasmania
Protected areas of Tasmania
Maritime history of the Dutch East India Company
Seal hunting
Whaling stations in Australia
Localities of Glamorgan–Spring Bay Council